Emmanuel Shaw II (born July 26, 1946) is the former Minister of Finance of Liberia who served from 1989 to 1990. He is the co-founder of Lonestar MTN Liberia.

References

External links
 "Liberia moves against Taylor aides," BBC

1946 births
Living people
Finance Ministers of Liberia
College of West Africa alumni